Isaac Ledyard (November 5, 1755 or 1754 – August 28, 1803) was a physician and politician from New York.

Life
He was born in Groton, Connecticut, the son of Youngs Ledyard (1731–1762) and Mary (Avery) Ledyard (1730–1787).

He was Health Officer for the Port of New York. Ledyard was a presidential elector in 1800, voting for Thomas Jefferson and Aaron Burr.

The town of Ledyard, Connecticut is named for his family.

1750s births
1803 deaths
1800 United States presidential electors
New York (state) Democratic-Republicans
People from Groton, Connecticut